The New Left Current (Neo Aristero Revma, NAR) was formed in late 1989, mainly by former Communist Youth of Greece (KNE) members.

History
As described in its website:The New Left Current - NAP, was formed in the early 1990s, primarily as an expression of the potential of left-wing dissent and rupture with the KKE line. The 1989 split took place when thousands of KNE and KKE activists openly clashed with the political choices of the KKE leadership and the united Coalition to join the Tzannetaki government with the ND and then with the so-called "ecumenical" government and the ND. PASOK. It was a confrontation on the catastrophic line of class cooperation and subjugation for the movement and the Left. In these conditions, tendencies and currents of left criticism and search were formed. The collapse of "existing socialism" sharpened and deepened the crisis of the communist Left. It revived the search for the deeper causes of the failure of the ruling left to confront capitalist aggression and barbarism, sharpened the disagreements and criticism that existed for many years within the KKE and the KNE. The birth of these quests and criticism, of the processes in the movement and the communist left, is the process of formation of the NAP.

Elections
The New Left Current participated in the 1990 elections as "Neo Aristero Revma - Laiki Antipoliteusi" and got 14,365 votes (0,22%). A critical figure at this early stage was Kostas Kappos, former member of the KKE and parliamentary representative.

In 1993 the NAR joined the Left Struggle (MERA) political coalition along with the Revolutionary Communist Movement of Greece (EKKE), Communist Party of Greece (Marxist-Leninist), Workers Revolutionary Party (EEK). The coalition received 8,160 votes in 1993 and 10,443 votes in the 1996 general elections.

In 1999, NAR, EKKE, EEK and the Independent Communist Organization of Serres (AKOS) formed the Radical Left Front (MERA). Since 2009, NAR, along with the other parties of MERA, with the exception of EEK, is part of the broader coalition Front of the Greek Anticapitalist Left (ANTARSYA).

Election results

1 Radical Left Front
2 Anticapitalist Left Cooperation for the Overthrow
3 Left Front Coalition
4 Workers Revolutionary Party

Ideology 
ΝΑΡ describes its ideology as "communist re-foundation". Members of the organization believe that communist ideas after the fall of the Soviet union need to be updated, since they believe that socialism was never achieved in the countries of "Existing Socialism".

Another big part of ΝΑΡ's rhetoric is the idea of "Capitalist Totalitarianism" (literal translation from "Ολοκληροτικός Καπιταλισμός" in Greek), or "Contemporary Totalitarianism" as they mention it in their international articles on their website. ΝΑΡ believes that capitalism in its current form has surpassed the "highest state of capitalism", which is Imperialism according to Vladimir Lenin, as stated in his influential book, Imperialism, the Highest Stage of Capitalism.

Youth League
In the early years, the youth wing of the NAR was still named KNE-ΝΑΡ, as even the general secretary of KNE, Giorgos Grapsas, and most of its politburo had joined NAR, but in the mid-1990s, it changed its name to the Youth of Communist Liberation (Neolaia Kommunistiki Apeleftherosi). Members of the Youth Communist Liberation participate in the United Independent Left Movement, a sum of left-wing student organisations, active in 3rd-level educational institutions (Universities - Technical Academical institutions) in Greece.

See also
Anticapitalist Left Cooperation for the Overthrow
Radical Left Front
Kostas Kappos

References

External links
PRIN - Weekly newspaper affiliated with NAR
Official page of Youth of Communist Liberation
Official page of New Left Current

Political parties established in 1989
Communist parties in Greece
Far-left politics in Greece
1989 establishments in Greece